Valiba Virundhu is a 1967 Indian Tamil-language film directed by Murasoli Maran and written by M. Karunanidhi. The film stars Ravichandran and Bharathi. It was released on 2 June 1967.

Plot 

An unemployed youth (Ravichandran) and a vivacious girl (Bharati) are neighbours who fight frequently on trivial matters. Bharathi's wealthy father (Balaiah) wants to donate some of his properties for charity. This is objected to by his nephew (Asokan) who intends to marry Bharati and seize all the properties. When Balaiah threatens to expel Asokan, the latter abducts Balaiah and replaces him with a doppelgänger. With the help of the doppelgänger, Asokan tries to marry Bharati, who is oblivious to the fact that her father has been abducted. However, Ravichandran successfully exposes Asokan, rescues the real Balaiah and marries Bharati.

Cast 
 Ravichandran
 Bharathi
 J. P. Chandrababu
 T. S. Balaiah
 S. A. Ashokan
 Vijayrani
 Radhi Devi

Production 
Valiba Virundhu was produced and directed by Murasoli Maran under the banner Mekala Pictures. M. Karunanidhi wrote the story and screenplay. Cinematography was by Amirdham, and the art direction was handled by Nagarajan. Editing was by R. Devarajan, and choreography by the duo Chinni-Sampath while the music was composed by Sudarsanam.

Reception 
Kalki praised Maran's direction and called the film entertaining.

References

Bibliography

External links 
 

1960s Tamil-language films
Films with screenplays by M. Karunanidhi
Films scored by R. Sudarsanam